The third season of the American reality show Bar Rescue premiered on February 10, 2013 and concluded on May 11, 2014. The series stars renown nightlife consultant Jon Taffer who offers his professional expertise plus renovations and equipment to desperately failing bars in order to save them from closing. This season was split into multiple parts.

Experts
 Jon Taffer – Host/Star/Bar Consultant/Recon Spy
 Nicole Taffer – Host's Wife/Marketing/Recon Spy

Chefs

 Ron Duprat
 Brian Duffy
 Aaron McCargo
 Jason Febres
 J.B. Brown
 Nick Liberato
 Tiffany Derry
 Tony Gemignani
 Brendan Collins
 Stretch – Culinary Expert/Fabricator
 Kevin Bludso
 Celina Tio
 Anthony Lamas
 Vic "Vic Vegas" Moea
 Eric Regan

Mixologists
 Ricky Gomez
 Joseph Brooke
 Elayne Duke-Duff
 Peter O'Connor
 Jenny Costa
 Russell Davis
 Franky Marshall
 Jen J
 Rachael Ford
 Adam Carmer
 Phil Wills
 Mia Mastroianni
 Trevor Frye
 Lisamarie Joyce
 Kate Gerwin

Other special experts
 Jessie Barnes – Hospitality
 Tommy Gregory – Artist/Sculptor
 Doc – Security
 Dan "Big Cat" Katz – Karaoke
 Fred Medrano – Karaoke Specialist
 Owen Benjamin – Comedy
 Gianluca Rizza – Comedy Club
 Dominique Kelley – Choreography
 Anthony Curtis – Gaming Specialist
 Dave Gravino – Owner of Iggy's Doughboys & Chowder House/Consultant
 Sal Ferro –  Contractor
 Steve Blovat – Health Inspector
 Brandy Starr – Hospitality
 John Naddour (a.k.a. HookahJohn) – Hookah

Production
Taffer has confirmed that season 3 of the show began filming in late October 2012, with 20 episodes being prepared to premiere on February 10, 2013. Season 3's episodes were split into three parts with the first half premiering on February 10, 2013 while the second and third half aired on October 6, 2013 and March 9, 2014 respectively.

Episodes

Notes

Controversies

Lawsuit
Jon and Nicole Taffer, along with the show's production company Bongo LLC, have been sued by Dr. Paul T. Wilkes from Bar 702 (formerly Sand Dollar). In "Don't Mess with Taffer's Wife", the bar and its staff were featured in, Paul is shown to hit on Nicole and Jon yells at him in retaliation. However, he claims that in reality that the producers ordered him to be sleazy and make offensive comments on women and texted him to "Hit on Mrs. Taffer hardcore!!" After he did so, instead of "setting him straight", the doctor claims that Taffer allegedly called the control room to tell them to have a drink near the spot where he intended to confront Dr. Wilkes, so he could throw it in his face and said to a colleague "Now I'm going to show you why my show is Number One." Dr. Wilkes then claimed that Jon Taffer came in to confront him and showed him footage of his audition tapes where he insulted the way Jon dressed. Jon then grabbed the drink in his hand, threw it in his face, and smashed the cup in his face. Jon then spit in his face and tore off his shirt so violently that buttons ripped off his shirt.  Jon then picked up the second drink that was planted and threw it in Dr. Wilkes' face.  After that, Jon swung at Dr. Wilkes' head with his electronic tablet and turned around to get his coat.  Dr. Wilkes thought Taffer was going for a weapon, so he tried to restrain him and was punched in his left jaw by him. Jon Taffer began hyperventilating and collapsed on the floor with the entire attack caught on camera. As a result of this attack, Dr. Wilkes claims he suffers from emotional distress and symptoms such as migraines, nausea, vomiting, night terrors, crying spells, severe depression, and anxiety attacks. There is currently no update on the lawsuit.

Wayne Mills murder
During the taping for the episode "Music City Mess", Taffer visited BoondoxXx BBQ & Juke Joint in Nashville, Tennessee and worked with owner Chris Ferrell who was noted for having a hot temper. The rescued bar was renamed Pit & Barrel and the episode featuring the bar was to air on November 24, 2013 but on the night before the episode was supposed to air, Ferrell was arrested by Nashville police for shooting and killing country singer Wayne Mills during an argument inside Pit & Barrel. Spike immediately pulled the episode from its originally scheduled premiere slot. It did not, however, remove the episode completely and the regularly scheduled encore presentation of the episode, which aired in the early morning hours of November 25, accidentally served as the premiere. The network drew criticism for the error in light of the circumstances.

Ferrell eventually stood trial for the murder of Mills and asserted he acted in self-defense, claiming that Mills had violated the bar's nonsmoking rule and had threatened to kill him with a broken beer bottle. The jury, however, convicted Ferrell of second-degree murder in March 2015 after a long-delayed trial and he was given a twenty-year sentence of which Ferrell is required to complete in its entirety. The verdict and sentence are being appealed.

References

External links
 
 Bar Rescue Updates — Unaffiliated site that keeps track of bars being open or closed and has updates for each bar

2013 American television seasons
2014 American television seasons
Bar Rescue